Glazunovsky (masculine), Glazunovskaya (feminine), or Glazunovskoye (neuter) is the name of several rural localities in Russia:
Glazunovskaya, Volgograd Oblast, a stanitsa in Glazunovsky Selsoviet of Kumylzhensky District of Volgograd Oblast
Glazunovskaya, Vologda Oblast, a village in Mishutinsky Selsoviet of Vozhegodsky District of Vologda Oblast